İbrahim Tusder (15 January 1915 – 1994) was a Turkish footballer. He competed in the men's tournament at the 1936 Summer Olympics.

References

External links
 

1915 births
1994 deaths
Turkish footballers
Turkey international footballers
Olympic footballers of Turkey
Footballers at the 1936 Summer Olympics
Footballers from Istanbul
Association football midfielders
Güneş S.K. players
Turkish football managers
Karşıyaka S.K. managers
Galatasaray S.K. footballers
Beşiktaş J.K. footballers
Vefa S.K. managers
Türk Telekom GSK managers